Ysgol Bryn Alyn is a secondary school in the county borough of Wrexham, Wales. Its catchment area includes its local primary schools within Gwersyllt and other nearby villages.

Curriculum 
At Key Stage 3 (KS3), students at Ysgol Bryn Alyn are taught all the mandatory subjects required by the Welsh National Curriculum. At the end of Key Stage 2 pupils are given Teacher Assessment (TA) levels from 3 to 7 in their core and foundation subjects. A special presentation afternoon during the year celebrates the achievement of Year 9 pupils throughout KS3.

At Key Stage 4 (GCSE level), students select two subjects to which they wish to study, alongside mandatory English, English Literature Mathematics, Double Science, Welsh Short Course and PE Full Course. Recently, college course opportunities at Coleg Cabria have been offered, however pupils wishing to opt for one of these lose an option subject. These are chosen in Year 9. Non-exam subjects are Physical Education and 
PSE. Students select up to two (plus two reserves) of the following WJEC GCSE subjects:
Art
Business Studies 
Child Development
Design Technology
Drama
Digital Technology
Spamish
Media Studies
Music
Physical Education
RS Full Course
Welsh Full
There are also other subjects which can be mixed with GCSE subjects, but a GCSE is not obtained at the end of these courses:
Working with the community

Structure of the school day and pupil management
The school day in its current form was launched in June 2019. It consists of five 60-minute lessons, and then the final lesson ends at the day at 3.00pm plus a 20 minute form time which starts at 08:40am and is used for Assembelies and Revision sessions

Many extra-curricular clubs are held in the school, including Music and Library activities, even with after school clubs like Film Club, Netball, Rounders and Football.

Facilities

The school has many facilities, including five ICT suites, a full (off-site) indoor swimming pool, a MUGA (Multi-Use Games Area), a sports hall, a Science Block and a library with a wide selection of fiction and non-fiction books.

Refurbishment and front block demolition 
In 2018 construction of a new Humanities block and improved facilities was completed, Including a Food Technology classroom and a Design Technology classroom.

Achievements 
Awards given to the school include

• Best Canteen in Wales 2011

See also
Wrexham
Wrexham County Borough
Investor in People

References 

Gwersyllt

External links 
 Official school website] 
http://www.ysgolbrynalyn.co.uk/ Current school website
Contact details and vacancies
List of schools in Wrexham
School details and pupil numbers

Secondary schools in Wrexham County Borough
Educational institutions established in 1958
1958 establishments in Wales